is a Japanese voice actress affiliated with VIMS. She is best known for voicing Suu in Monster Musume and Konomi in Paradise of Innocence.

Filmography

Television animation
 2012
 Aikatsu!

 2013
 Nyaruko: Crawling with Love as Waitress (ep 4)

 2014
 Bladedance of Elementalers as Student (ep 3)

 2015
 Monster Musume as Suu

OVA 
 2013
 Rescue Me! as Sayaka Shimizu

 2014
 Paradise of Innocence as Konomi

Video games
 2011
 Gal*Gun

 2012
 Uta no?Prince-sama? Debut

 2013
 Xblaze Code: Embryo as Es

 2015
 Xblaze: Lost Memories as Es

 2016
 BlazBlue: Central Fiction as Es

References

External links 
 

1989 births
Living people
Japanese video game actresses
Japanese voice actresses
Voice actresses from Tokyo